RV The Princess Royal is a research vessel owned and operated by Newcastle University as part of the School of Marine Science and Technology. Designed by in-house naval architects from the school, The Princess Royal replaced the previous RV Bernicia as the school's research vessel.

Design
The Princess Royal has a twin hull, deep-vee form with each hull having a bulbous bow. The hull form aims to improve seakeeping, stability and fuel efficiency and was designed by the School of Marine Science and Technology at Newcastle University. The ship was built by Alnmarintec in Blyth to MCA category 2 requirements and is constructed from aluminium alloy.

The Princess Royal is equipped with a 6.5 tonne-metre knuckle boom crane, a 2 tonne hydraulic A-frame, two trawl winches, a pot hauler two ROV winches and a 5-metre Rigid Inflatable Boat.

Powering the vessel are two MAN D2676 diesel engines coupled to two fixed-pitch propellers.

Namesake
The Princess Royal is named after Princess Anne who christened the ship during a ceremony in Blyth on 4 February 2011.

References 

Newcastle University
Research vessels of the United Kingdom
2011 ships